Neocollyris angularis is a species of ground beetle in the genus Neocollyris in the family Carabidae. It was described by Horn in 1892.

References

Angularis, Neocollyris
Beetles described in 1892
Taxa named by Walther Horn